The first season of the American television drama series Falling Skies commenced airing on June 19 and concluded on August 7, 2011. It consisted of ten episodes, each running approximately 40 minutes in length. TNT broadcast the first season on Sundays at 10:00 pm in the United States.

The first season picks up six months after the invasion and follows a group of survivors who band together to fight back. The group, known as the Second Massachusetts (an allusion to a historical regiment from the Continental Army), is led by the retired Captain Weaver and Boston University history professor Tom Mason who, while in search of his son Ben, must put his extensive knowledge of military history into practice as one of the leaders of the resistance movement.

The first season was met with positive reviews and the two-hour premiere was watched by 5.9 million viewers, making it cable television's biggest series launch of the year, with more than 2.6 million adults 18–49 and 3.2 million adults 25–54. The first-season finale received 5.6 million viewers, the highest-rated episode since the series premiere; with 2.5 million viewers in the 18–49 demographic.

Cast and characters

Main
 Noah Wyle as Tom Mason, a former Boston University military history professor who becomes the second-in-command of the 2nd Massachusetts resistance, about 300 civilians and fighters fleeing Boston, fallen to invading aliens. He has three sons: Hal, the oldest, Ben, the middle child who was taken by the Skitters, and Matt, the youngest. His wife died a short time after the invasion while gathering supplies. He becomes friends with Anne Glass, and more.
 Moon Bloodgood as Anne Glass, the 2nd Mass's doctor. She was a pediatrician before the invasion. She supports civilians' rights to Weaver. Her husband and son were killed during the invasion, and she regrets having no photographs to remember them.
 Drew Roy as Hal Mason, Tom's oldest son. He is 16 years old, and a Scout in the 2nd Mass. His first girlfriend is Karen, although other girls do flirt, and he becomes closer to Maggie after Karen is taken.
 Jessy Schram as Karen Nadler, a teenage girl who works as a Scout in the resistance army. She lost her family in the invasion. Hal is her boyfriend. She is captured by the aliens, harnessed, and works for them.
 Maxim Knight as Matt, Tom's youngest son. His birthday wish is that everything return to before, but he soon volunteers to help Scott with the radio and Pope making mech-killing ammunition.
 Seychelle Gabriel as Lourdes, a former first year medical student who assists Anne. She is religious, and her faith is still strong despite the circumstances. She has a crush on Hal, discouraged by Karen.
 Peter Shinkoda as Dai, a fighter. Dai had no family to lose in the invasion, so seeing Tom as worrying parent, he counts his blessings.
 Mpho Koaho as Anthony, a former Boston cop who is a fighter in the 2nd Mass and part of Tom's team.
 Connor Jessup as Ben Mason, Tom's 14-year-old second son who was captured by the Skitters. In the pilot, Hal saw Ben among children wearing spinal harnesses, controlled by Skitters. He is eventually rescued and the harness removed, but the chemical changes, including strength and energy, and can hear radio waves[an ability used to hold off skitters and Mechs].
 Will Patton as Dan Weaver, the commander of the 2nd Mass. Weaver is a retired active and reserve military officer with the rank of captain, who served with Porter during the Gulf War. He does not like that the 2nd Mass includes so many civilians, but recognizes their role in giving fighters hope. He believes his family is lost, but finds evidence his wife and eldest daughter survived. Weaver was religious, but lost faith when the aliens came.
 Sarah Carter as Margaret ("Maggie"), was coerced and raped by Pope's team, so willingly helped Tom's squad escape. She wants to earn a place in the 2nd Mass. She knows opiate drug sources and the hospital where Skitters keep harnessed children because she had "bad" cancer at 16.
 Colin Cunningham as John Pope, the leader of a post-apocalyptic gang. He captured Tom, Hal, Karen, Anthony, and Dai and intended to trade them back to the 2nd Mass in exchange for an M2 Browning. Pope was captured and the rest of his gang killed when the alien ship shot at their flares.

Recurring
 Bruce Gray as Scott, Anne's uncle, teaches kids biology and repairs an old tube radio that detects Skitters communicating.
 Dylan Authors as Jimmy Boland, a 13-year-old soldier who fights in the 2nd Mass.
 Daniyah Ysrayl as Rick, son of Mike. He was harnessed by the Skitters.
 Martin Roach as Mike Thompson, a soldier for the 2nd Mass. His son was captured by the aliens. He was killed in Sanctuary Part 2 by Terry Clayton who took children, including all from 2nd Mass, for the Skitters.
 Dale Dye as Colonel Porter, the leader of the resistance against the Skitters in Boston. He was a U.S. military officer on the verge of retirement when the invasion came.
 Steven Weber as Michael Harris, a medical surgeon was friends with Tom and his wife, until he left her to attacking aliens. He finds the procedure to cut away harnesses with a blowtorch, leaving spikes, and medicate heavily with opiates to reduce withdrawal from harness-injected chemicals. He is killed while trying to inject a wounded Skitter brought back by Tom.
 Lynne Deragon as Aunt Kate, Anne's aunt and Scott's wife.
 Melissa Kramer as Sarah, a pregnant civilian in 2nd Mass.
 Henry Czerny as Terry Clayton
 Brent Jones as Click

Episodes

Production

Conception 
Development officially began in 2009, when TNT announced that it had ordered to pilot an untitled alien invasion project. Falling Skies was created by Robert Rodat, who is best known for writing the Oscar-winning film Saving Private Ryan, which was directed by Steven Spielberg. Rodat wrote the pilot episode from an idea which was co-conceived by Spielberg. Originally, Falling Skies was called Concord, referencing the Battles of Lexington and Concord and Tom Mason's profession as a former History Professor. Spielberg then came up with the title Falling Skies. "I felt that this was a very interesting postapocalyptic story with a 21st century [spin on the] spirit of '76. I came up — out of the blue one day — with the name Falling Skies, which is basically what happens to the planet after this invasion. What is unique about this particular series is that the story starts after a successful conquest of the world," he stated. What attracted Spielberg to the project was the story of survival. "I've always been interested in how we survive and how resourceful we are as Americans. How would the survivors feed the children? How do they resupply themselves militarily in order to defend and even take back what they have lost?" he added. Like much of Spielberg's work, such as The Pacific and E.T. the Extra-Terrestrial, Falling Skies''' running theme is family and brotherhood. He said of this "It's a theme I harken back to a lot because it's something I believe in. It's something I have the closest experience with. [Laughs] They say write what you know, and with seven children and three sisters... I tend to always come back to the family as a touchstone for audiences to get into these rather bizarre stories."

While writing the pilot, Rodat dedicated a five-page montage to the alien invasion, but decided not to go through with it as it had been done before. "I wrote a few drafts of it and I looked at and say, 'Ay-yay-yay, I’ve seen this before. There’s no emotion to this. It feels like one of those montages,'" he said. Rodat came up with the idea of having the children in the series "harnessed by aliens". "When we were working out the initial stuff, the thing that excited [Spielberg] was the idea that adults are killed if they’re a threat, and kids are captured for whatever reason and changed or altered. The harness was a logical outgrowth of that. Then what we’ll explore is what the harnessing does to the kid over the course of the show but that also is something that’s going to have to unveil itself gradually," he stated. Spielberg previously explored the idea of enslaved children in the 1984 film Indiana Jones and the Temple of Doom.

Series lead Noah Wyle emphasized Spielberg's presence on set by stating "Anytime he gives an anointment to a project, it steps up the pedigree." Colin Cunningham, who plays outlaw John Pope, exclaimed "You’d show up and think, ‘This is not a TV show; this is something else that we’re doing,’ " he said, noting that Spielberg was very hands-on for the pilot. "Its scope is massive. Anytime you hear the word Spielberg, you know it’s not going to be crap; you know it’ll be quality and there will be some money behind it." Mark Verheiden, who was the showrunner for the first season, stated "It’s great to know you have a world-class filmmaker backing up what you’re trying to do who is supportive and helping design the great stuff."

 Casting 

Casting announcements began in June 2009 when Noah Wyle was announced as the lead. Wyle, who worked with TNT on the Librarian films, was sent scripts for various shows on their network. He said part of the reason he chose the part was to gain credibility from his children. "With the birth of my kids, I started to really look at my career through their eyes more than my own, so that does dictate choice, steering me toward certain things and away from other things," he said. He also decided to do it as he could relate with his character, stating "I identified with Tom's devotion to his sons, and admired his sense of social duty." Spielberg wanted Wyle for the role because he knew him from his previous series ER, which Spielberg's company produced. He had wanted Wyle to appear in his 1998 film Saving Private Ryan but due to scheduling conflicts, he was unable to star. Spielberg stated that he was determined to work with him again. In July 2009, Moon Bloodgood, Jessy Schram, Seychelle Gabriel and Maxim Knight were cast as Anne Glass, Karen Nadler, Lourdes and Matt Mason, respectively. Bloodgood, the female lead, did not have to audition for the role. She received the script and was offered the role. Bloodgood was drawn to the role because of Spielberg and Rodat's involvement. She stated: "Well certainly when you get handed a script and they tell you it’s Bob Rodat and Steven Spielberg, you’re immediately drawn to it. It’s got your attention. I was a little cautious about wanting to do science fiction again. But it was more of a drama story, more of a family story. I liked that and I wanted to work with Spielberg." Bloodgood added that portraying a doctor excited her. "I liked the idea of playing a doctor and deviating from something I had done already," she said. In August 2009, Drew Roy and Peter Shinkoda were cast as Hal Mason and Dai, respectively. Drew Roy's agent received the script and the pair joked that Roy might get the role. "This one came to me through my agent, just like everything else. We even joked about the fact that it was a Steven Spielberg project. We were like, "Oh yeah, I might have a chance." We were just joking." He auditioned four times for the part. "The whole process went on for quite some time, and then towards the end, it was down to me and one other guy, and we were literally waiting for the word from Steven Spielberg ‘cause he had to watch the two audition tapes and give the okay. That, in and of itself, had me like, "Okay, even if I don’t get it, that’s just cool." Fortunately, it went my way."

 Crew 
Rodat and Spielberg serve as executive producers on the project. Graham Yost, Justin Falvey and Darryl Frank are also executive producers. Yost had previously worked with Spielberg on the HBO miniseries The Pacific. Mark Verheiden is a co-executive producer and the series showrunner. Verheiden had worked as a writer and producer on Battlestar Galactica. Greg Beeman is also a co-executive producer. Melinda Hsu Taylor is a supervising producer for the series; she previously worked on Lost. John Ryan is the on set producer. Remi Aubuchon was hired as the showrunner for the second season in May 2011 before the first-season premiere. TNT announced production had begun on the second season on October 24, 2011.

 Distribution 

 Promotion 

The show's official website offered an online web-comic prior to the show's launch. The comic, released every two weeks, follows the characters of the series just weeks after the alien invasion. It is published by Dark Horse Comics and a 104-page comic was released on July 5, 2011. Character videos are also available online. The videos explore the main characters of Falling Skies.
As part of the promotional campaign, a vehicle, with the TNT logo and called Falling Skies Technical was released as a free gift in the social networking game Mafia Wars on June 14, 2011.

 Blu-ray and DVD releases 
The first season was released on DVD and Blu-ray on June 5, 2012, in North America, on July 2, 2012, in the United Kingdom and on August 29, 2012, in Australia. In addition to all the episodes of the first season, extras include an extended version of the pilot episode; audio commentary on the pilot episode; a Season two preview; the 2011 San Diego Comic-Con International panel; deleted scenes; character profiles; international promos; behind the scenes featurettes, including the "Making of Skitter", "Harness Makeup Tips" and "Director One on One". A collectible Trading Card was released exclusively to Blu-ray.

 Broadcast 

The series premiered on June 19, 2011, and is broadcast on the cable television channel TNT, in the United States. In Summer 2011, it premiered internationally in more than 75 countries.

  — TNT
  — Fox8
  — TNT
  — Super Channel and Ztélé (in French)
  — TNT
  — TNT
  — TNT
  — Orange Cinémax
  — TNT Serie
  — FX
  - FX
  — TNT
  — TNT
  — TNT España
  — FX
  — TNT
  — TNT

 Reception 

 Critical reception Falling Skies received generally positive reviews from television critics. Tim Goodman of The Hollywood Reporter wrote "...the entertainment value and suspense of Falling Skies is paced just right. You get the sense that we'll get those answers eventually. And yet, you want to devour the next episode immediately." Thomas Conner of the Chicago Sun-Times called it "...a trustworthy family drama but with aliens." He continued, "It's 'Jericho' meets 'V', with the good from both and the bad discarded. It'll raise the summer-TV bar significantly." Ken Tucker from Entertainment Weekly gave the series a B+ and wrote, "A similar, gradually developed, but decisive conviction makes Falling Skies an engaging, if derivative, chunk of dystopian sci-fi." He continued, "...Falling Skies rises above any one performance; it's the spectacle of humans versus aliens that draws you in." In the Boston Herald, Mark A. Perigard gave the series a B grade, writing "Don't look now, but Falling Skies could be a summer obsession."

In Variety, Brian Lowry stated that he enjoyed the action sequences but that "the soapier elements mostly fall flat", and called the series "painfully old-fashioned".
Mike Hale, from The New York Times, called the series "average" and "good on the action, a little muddled on the ideas". He added that "the tone is placid and slightly monotonous, as if we were watching the Walton family at the end of the world".The Washington Post reviewer Hank Steuver criticized the actor portrayals, writing that "the show is slowed by so many wooden performances, Wyle's included". He also states he found himself "root[ing] for the aliens, which cannot have been the writers' intent".
In The Miami Herald, Glenn Garvin also criticized the poor acting, stating, "the 'Falling Skies' cast appears unconvinced and unconvincing." Garvin singled out the performance of Sarah Carter as the only exception, and added that Spielberg has "bottomed out" with this family drama series. At review aggregator Metacritic the first season scored 71%, based on 27 critic reviews, indicating "generally favorable reviews."

 Ratings 
The two-hour premiere of Falling Skies was watched by 5.9 million viewers, making it cable television's biggest series launch of the year, with more than 2.6 million adults 18–49 and 3.2 million adults 25–54. The eighth episode was watched by 4.31 million viewers and scored a 1.5 ratings share among adults 18-49 and became TNT's highest-rated series in target demos. The first-season finale received 5.6 million viewers, the highest-rated episode since the series premiere; with 2.5 million viewers in the 18–49 demographic. The first season tied with the FX drama series American Horror Story'' as the biggest new cable series of the year among adults 18–49. In the UK, it premiered on the non-terrestrial channel FX, with 402,000 viewers.

References

External links 
 

 
2011 American television seasons
Falling Skies (season 1) episodes